The 14095 / 14096 Himalayan Queen Express is an Express train belonging to Indian Railways – Northern Railway zone that runs between  &  in India.

It operates as train number 14095 from Delhi Sarai Rohilla to Kalka and as train number 14096 in the reverse direction serving the states of Delhi, Haryana & the Union Territory of Chandigarh.

Coaches

The 14095 / 96 Delhi Sarai Rohilla–Kalka Himalayan Queen Express has 1 AC Chair Car, 7 Second Class seating, 6 General Unreserved & 2 SLR (Seating cum Luggage Rake) coaches. It does not carry a pantry car.

As is customary with most train services in India, coach composition may be amended at the discretion of Indian Railways depending on demand.

In addition, it carries 8 coaches of the 14795 / 96 Bhiwani–Kalka Ekta Express.

Service

Routeing

Traction

As the route is fully electrified, a Ghaziabad-based WAP-7 locomotive powers the train for its entire journey.

References

External links

Named passenger trains of India
Rail transport in Delhi
Rail transport in Haryana
Express trains in India